Southern Carrier, Lower Carrier or locally known as Dakelh is an endangered dialect group of the Athabaskan Carrier language of British Columbia, Canada. The dialects belonging to Southern Carrier roughly correspond to those to the south of Fort St. James. The group is divided into two subgroups, Fraser/Nechakoh and Blackwater which are further subdivided into individual dialects.

The Fraser/Nechakoh subdivision of Southern Carrier includes the Lheidli, Saik'uz, Nadleh, Nautey, Stelakoh, Stoney Creek, Prince George and Cheslatta dialects. The Blackwater division includes the Anahim Lake, Red Bluff, Nazko, Kluskus, and Ulkatcho dialects.

Southern Carrier has an extremely extensive and productive system of noun classifications. It has multiple classification subsystems and they can take place in the same sentence or same verb.

Fluent Speakers 
According to a 2016 census conducted by the Government of Canada, there were 1,270 fluent speakers of the Carrier language. Among the 1,270 speakers, 1,045 have the language as a single mother tongue and 225 have the language as one of their mother tongues.

FirstVoices Language Learning

FirstVoices Website 
FirstVoices is an online indigenous languages archiving and learning resource administered by the First Peoples' Cultural Council of British Columbia, Canada. Dakelh/Southern Carrier language is one of the languages documented on the website. Information on alphabets, words, phrases, songs, and stories are available. Both orthography and voice recordings are provided on the website. Games and a kids portal are also available for pre-readers to engage with the language.

FirstVoices App 
The Nazko-Dakelh mobile application has a bilingual dictionary and a collection of Dakelh/Southern Carrier language phrases that are archived on the FirstVoices website. It is available for free on both Apple and Android mobile operating systems.

References

External links 

 Southern Carrier / Dakelh Language on FirstVoices
 Lheidli dictionary

First Nations languages in Canada
Endangered Dené–Yeniseian languages
Dakelh
Northern Athabaskan languages